Simon Holbek Kønigsfeldt (born 10 March 1986) is a Danish long-distance runner. In 2020, he competed in the men's race at the 2020 World Athletics Half Marathon Championships held in Gdynia, Poland.

References

External links 
 

Living people
1986 births
Place of birth missing (living people)
Danish male long-distance runners
Danish male marathon runners